Thomas Michael Franklin "Frank" Cownie (born 1948) is the current mayor of Des Moines, Iowa. He also owns and operates Cownie Furs, a store that has been in his family for generations.

Cownie is a Des Moines native. He grew up on the city's west side, attending Theodore Roosevelt High School and Iowa State University. He came from a political family; both of his parents served on the city's school board.

Prior to serving as mayor, he served for two years as an at-large member of the Des Moines City Council. He also served several terms on the Planning and Zoning Commission and was chairman of Downtown Des Moines, Inc.

While Iowa's city elections are non-partisan, Cownie is a Democrat. He narrowly finished second in a six-way primary in 2003, and later defeated Councilwoman Christine Hensley by a nine-point margin. He succeeded fellow Democrat Preston Daniels. In 2015 he was re-elected for a fourth term with 80 percent of the vote, 61 points ahead of Anthony Taylor. Cownie narrowly won re-election in 2019 in a runoff against challenger Jack Hatch. Having been elected to five terms, Cownie is the longest-serving mayor in Des Moines history.

See also
 2003 Des Moines mayoral election
 2007 Des Moines mayoral election
 2011 Des Moines mayoral election
 2015 Des Moines mayoral election
 2019 Des Moines mayoral election
 List of mayors of Des Moines, Iowa
 Timeline of Des Moines, Iowa#21st century

References

External links
Cownie statement made before a US House of Representative's subcommittee

1948 births
21st-century American politicians
Iowa Democrats
Iowa State University alumni
Living people
Mayors of Des Moines, Iowa
Des Moines
Theodore Roosevelt High School (Iowa) alumni
People from Des Moines, Iowa